The VI Central American Games (Spanish: VI Juegos Deportivos Centroamericanos) was a multi-sport event that took place between 5–15 December 1997.   The shooting competitions were hosted by San Salvador, El Salvador.

The games had to be postponed, because the original date (5–14 September 1997) could not be kept for various reasons, among others delayed construction works.

The games were opened by Honduran president Carlos Roberto Reina.

Venues
 Football: Estadio Olímpico Metropolitano and Estadio Francisco Morazán in San Pedro Sula, Estadio Excélsior in Puerto Cortés
 Shooting: San Salvador,

Participation
Athletes from 7 countries were reported to participate:

 (277)

 Panamá

Sports
The competition featured 27 disciplines in 25 sports (plus beach volleyball as exhibition).<ref
name=nacion_02a/> The following list was compiled from a variety of articles
from the archive of Costa Rican newspaper La Nación.

Aquatic sports
 Swimming
 Water polo
 Athletics
 Baseball
 Basketball
 Bodybuilding
 Bowling
 Boxing
 Chess
 Cycling
 Equestrian
 Fencing
 Football
 Gymnastics
 Judo
 Karate
 Racquetball
 Shooting
 Softball
 Table tennis
 Taekwondo
 Tennis
 Triathlon
Volleyball
 Beach volleyball†
 Volleyball
 Weightlifting
 Wrestling

†: Exhibition contest

Medal table 
The medals below are compiled from Costa Rican newspaper La Nación and from Nicaraguan newspapers La Prensa and El Nuevo Diario. The table is complete now.

References 

Central American Games
Central American Games
International sports competitions hosted by Honduras
Central American Games
1997 in Central American sport
Multi-sport events in Honduras